Amanda Lucas (born July 1, 1981) is an American retired professional mixed martial artist. She is the eldest daughter of movie director and producer George Lucas and film editor Marcia Lucas.

Early life
Amanda Lucas is the daughter of George and Marcia Lucas. She was adopted during their marriage, after they unsuccessfully tried to conceive a child. Subsequent to her parents' divorce in 1983, legal custody of Amanda was equally split between George and Marcia as part of the terms of their settlement.

Mixed martial arts career
After her husband brought her to a mixed martial arts event, Lucas took an interest in fighting, feeling it would help her lose weight and overcome her childhood bullying growing up as "a 'fat and wimpy' kid." She earned a purple belt in Brazilian jiu-jitsu, and also trained in Muay Thai.

Known as "Powerhouse," Lucas was knocked out in the third round of her 2008 pro MMA debut but rebounded the following year with a unanimous decision victory to even her record.

Lucas faced Hikaru Shinohara at DEEP: "55 Impact" on August 26, 2011. She defeated Shinohara by technical submission due to an armbar in the first round.

She returned to DEEP at "Cage Impact 2011 in Tokyo" on October 29, 2011. Lucas defeated Mika Harigai by submission due to a rear-naked choke in round one.

Lucas next faced professional wrestler and MMA veteran Yumiko Hotta at DEEP: "57 Impact" on February 18, 2012. The fight was contested for the DEEP women's open-weight championship. Lucas defeated Hotta by submission due to a keylock in the third round.

On December 8, 2012, Lucas faced Yuiga in a non-title bout at DEEP: "Cage Impact 2012 in Tokyo." The use of elbows was permitted in the fight. Lucas defeated Yuiga by majority decision.

Lucas planned to fight twice in 2013, but the first bout fell through and the second was cancelled as the result of Lucas sustaining an injury. She eventually decided to withdraw from MMA activities to have a child, her son Felix, born in July 2014.

Championships and accomplishments

Mixed martial arts
 Deep
 Deep Openweight Women's Championship

Mixed martial arts record

|-
| Win
| align=center | 5–1
| Yuiga
| Decision (majority)
| DEEP: Cage Impact 2012 in Tokyo
| 
| align=center | 2
| align=center | 5:00
| Tokyo, Japan
| 
|-
| Win
| align=center | 4–1
| Yumiko Hotta
| Submission (keylock)
| DEEP: 57 Impact
| 
| align=center | 3
| align=center | 2:16
| Tokyo, Japan
| 
|-
| Win
| align=center | 3–1
| Mika Harigai
| Submission (rear-naked choke)
| Deep: Cage Impact 2011 in Tokyo, 1st Round
| 
| align=center | 1
| align=center | 4:32
| Tokyo, Japan
|
|-
| Win
| align=center | 2–1
| Hikaru Shinohara
| Technical Submission (armbar)
| Deep: 55 Impact
| 
| align=center | 1
| align=center | 4:37
| Tokyo, Japan
|
|-
| Win
| align=center | 1–1
| Christen Bedwell
| Decision (unanimous)
| Freestyle Cage Fighting 37
| 
| align=center | 3
| align=center | 3:00
| Tulsa, Oklahoma, United States
|
|-
| Loss
| align=center | 0–1
| Nicole Kavanaugh
| TKO (punches)
| Princesses of Pain: Australasia vs. America
| 
| align=center | 3
| align=center | 2:24
| Auckland, New Zealand
|

Film roles
Amanda and her younger sister Katie (born in 1988) appeared in Star Wars: Episode I – The Phantom Menace (1999) in credited roles. Amanda was the voice of Tey How, the alien controller in the droid control ship. She was credited as Tyger. She can also be seen in Jabba the Hutt's box during the Podrace scene as Diva Funquita.

Amanda also appeared in the other two prequels, as did her sister Katie and her younger brother Jett. None of them were, however, credited for Star Wars: Episode II – Attack of the Clones (2002). In this movie, Amanda made a cameo as Adnama, one of the patrons in the Outlander Club, in the scene where Anakin Skywalker chases Zam Wesell.

She was credited again, this time as Amanda Lucas, for Star Wars: Episode III – Revenge of the Sith (2005). Her role was given the name of Terr Taneel, although she did not have any lines. She is one of the human senators next to Bail Organa and Mon Mothma. The man Lucas talks to in the scene is her husband, Jason Hallikaine.

Personal life
Amanda is the only daughter of Marcia and George Lucas.
As a single father her dad George adopted her younger siblings Katie and Jett.
In 2013 her father married Mellody Hobson and their daughter Everest was born in 2014.

She is married to Jason Hallikainen and their son Felix was born in 2014.

See also
 List of current mixed martial arts champions
 List of female mixed martial artists

References

External links
 Amanda Lucas Awakening Profile
 
 

1981 births
American female mixed martial artists
Mixed martial artists utilizing Muay Thai
Mixed martial artists utilizing Brazilian jiu-jitsu
Mixed martial artists from California
American Muay Thai practitioners
Female Muay Thai practitioners
American practitioners of Brazilian jiu-jitsu
Female Brazilian jiu-jitsu practitioners
Actresses from San Francisco
American child actresses
American film actresses
American adoptees
Living people
George Lucas
20th-century American actresses
Deep (mixed martial arts) champions